Scott Roth (born June 25, 1988) is an American pole vaulter.

Achievements

External links

1988 births
Living people
American male pole vaulters